Cyclophoridae is a taxonomic family of small to large tropical land snails  with an operculum, terrestrial gastropod mollusks in the order  Architaenioglossa belonging to the subclass Caenogastropoda (according to the taxonomy of the Gastropoda by Bouchet & Rocroi, 2005).

This diverse family with many species is now  limited to the representatives in the tropics and subtropics of the Old and New World.

Their fossil history dates back through the Early Tertiary to the Cenomanian age of the Cretaceous.

Description
The dextral shells are mostly of small and rarely medium size. The form of the shell varies from discoidal to turbinate. The round aperture is often modified, sometimes with an incision or a constriction. The last whorl can sometimes be disconnected  and then extends strongly from the winding plane. The operculum is generally circular, which can be retracted deeply into the shell. Its form is multispiral and can be calcified or lacking calcareous overlay. The outer layer of the operculum can contain accessory deposits.

The head of the soft body ends in a short proboscis. The tentacles are round in cross-section, relatively long and taper to the end. The eyes are located at the base of the antenna on flat papillae. The longitudinal muscular foot is not divided. The mantle cavity acts as a lung cavity. The taenioglossan radula has seven elements per transverse row. The central row of the radula contains usually five, rarely three or seven teeth. The animals are dioecious.

Taxonomy and systematics

This family consists of the following subfamilies according to the taxonomy of the Gastropoda by Bouchet & Rocroi, 2005, which adapted the tribes of Cyclophorinae from the system used by Wenz (1938). Thirty five genera containing approximately 810 species have been recognized as in 2008.

Some notable genera are also listed here:
 Subfamily Cyclophoridae incertae sedis (taxon inquirendum)
 Acroptychia Crosse & P. Fischer, 1877
Anosycolus Fischer-Piette, C.P. Blanc, F. Blanc & Salvat, 1993
 † Archaeocyclotus Asato & Hirano in Hirano et al., 2019 
 Boucardicus Fischer-Piette & Bedoucha, 1965
 Dominamaria Iredale, 1941
 Ettemona Iredale, 1941
 Hainesia L. Pfeiffer, 1856
 † Hirsuticyclus Neubauer, Xing & Jochum, 2019 
 Madgeaconcha Griffiths & Florens, 2004
 Naggsiaconcha Griffiths & Florens, 2004
 Nobuea Kuroda & Miyanaga, 1943
 † Palaeocyclophorus Wenz, 1923 
 † Tropidogyra Wenz, 1923 
 Ventriculus Wenz in Fischer & Wenz, 1914
 Cyclophorus incertae sedis (temporary name)
Subfamily Alycaeinae Blanford, 1864: raised to the rank of family Alycaeidae in 2020 
Subfamily Cyclophorinae Gray, 1847
Tribe Caspicyclotini Wenz, 1938
Caspicyclotus Forcart, 1935
Tribe Cyathopomatini Kobelt & Möllendorff, 1897
Cyathopoma Blanford & Blanford, 1861
Jerdonia Blanford & Blanford, 1861
Mychopoma Blanford, 1869
Pseudojerdonia Kobelt, 1902
Tribe Cyclophorini Gray, 1847
Afroditropis Bequaert & Clench, 1936
Craspedotropis Blanford, 1864
Crossopoma von Martens, 1891
Cyclophorus Montfort, 1810
Cyclosurus Morelet, 1881
Ditropopsis Smith, 1897
Elgonocyclus Verdcourt, 1982
Japonia Gould, 1859
Lagocheilus Blanford, 1864
Leptopoma Pfeiffer, 1847
Leptopomoides Nevill, 1878
Micraulax Theobald, 1876
Montanopoma Stanisic, 2010
Myxostoma Troschel, 1847
Otopoma Gray, 1850
Owengriffithsius Emberton, 2002
Papuocyclus Ancey, 1895
Pilosphaera Lee, Lue & Wu, 2008
Ptychopoma Möllendorff, 1885
Scabrina Blanford, 1863
Theobaldius Nevill, 1878
Tribe Cyclotini Pfeiffer, 1853
Cyclotus Swainson, 1840
Opisthoporus Benson, 1851
Platyrhaphe Möllendorff, 1890
Tribe Pterocyclini Kobelt & Möllendorff, 1897
Millotorbis Fischer-Piette & Bedoucha, 1965
Pterocyclos Benson, 1832
Rhiostoma Benson, 1860
Spiraculum Pearson, 1833
Incertae sedis
Pholeoteras Sturany, 1904
Incertae sedis
Incertae sedis
† Eotrichophorus Bullis, Herhold, Czekanski-Moir, Grimaldi & Rundell, 2020 †
†Pseudarinia Yen, 1952 
Subfamily Spirostomatinae Tielecke, 1940
Incertae sedis
Spirostoma Heude, 1885

References

Sources

 Kobelt, W. (1909). Cyclophoridae. Berlin: Verlag von R. Friedländer und Sohn. The standard reference based on shell morphology.
 Nantarat, N., Sutcharit, C., Tongkerd, P., Ablett, J., Naggs, F. & Panha, S. (2014). An annotated catalogue of type specimes of the land snail genus Cyclophorus Monfort, 1810 (Caenogastropoda, Cyclophoridae) in the Natural History Museum, London. ZooKeys, 411, 1–56.

 
Taxa named by John Edward Gray